Donore may refer to the following places in Ireland:
 Donore, County Meath, village near the Louth border
 Donore, County Westmeath, a townland in Multyfarnham civil parish
 Donore, Dublin, area of the Liberties, formerly a barony.